Stolpsee is a lake in the Mecklenburg Lake District, in Germany. It is situated in the district of Oberhavel in the state of Brandenburg. The resort of Himmelpfort lies on the north bank of the lake.

The navigable River Havel flows through the lake, entering it via a  channel from the Schwedtsee. The Stolpsee is the lowest of the chain of lakes within the Mecklenburg Lake District that the river flows through, and on exit the river flows for some  before reaching the next lake, the Tegeler See on the outskirts of Berlin. Navigation is administered as part of the Obere–Havel–Wasserstraße.

The Stolpsee is also linked to the Hausee via a short canal and lock at Himmelpfort, forming the first link of the Lychener Gewässer that provides navigable access to the town of Lychen.

References 

Lakes of Brandenburg
Federal waterways in Germany